Ekiti may refer to:

Ekiti people, one of the largest subgroups of Yoruba people of West Africa
Ekiti, Kwara, a Local Government Area in Kwara State, Nigeria
Ekiti State in western Nigeria